Panaspis helleri is a species of lidless skinks in the family Scincidae. The species is found in the Democratic Republic of the Congo.

References

Panaspis
Reptiles described in 1932
Reptiles of the Democratic Republic of the Congo
Endemic fauna of the Democratic Republic of the Congo
Taxa named by Arthur Loveridge